Rød is the Norwegian and Danish word for the color "red".  It is also a shortened version of the Norwegian dialect word røddning (or rødning), meaning a cleared place. 

Rød may also refer to:

People
Rød (surname), a list of many people with this surname

Places
Rød, Arendal, a village in Arendal municipality in Agder county, Norway
Rød, Gjerstad, a village in Gjerstad municipality in Agder county, Norway
Rød, Østfold, a village in Hvaler municipality in Viken county, Norway

Other
Rød Valgallianse, a former far-left party in Norway
Rød pølse, red, boiled pork sausage common in Denmark
Rød snø, a Norwegian/Swedish thriller television series

See also
Rod (disambiguation)